Khalino is a rural locality in Klyukvinsky Selsoviet Rural Settlement, Kursky District, Kursk Oblast, Russia. Population:

Geography 
The village is located in the Seym River basin (a left tributary of the Desna), 102 km from the Russia–Ukraine border, 4 km east of the district center – the town Kursk, 3 km from the selsoviet center – Dolgoye.

 Streets
There are the following streets in the locality: Achkasova and Ryabinovaya (268 houses).

 Climate
Khalino has a warm-summer humid continental climate (Dfb in the Köppen climate classification).

Transport 
Khalino is located 2.5 km from the federal route  (Kursk – Voronezh –  "Kaspy" Highway; a part of the European route ), on the road of intermunicipal significance  (R-298 – Khalino), 4 km from the nearest railway halt 13 km (railway line Kursk – 146 km).

The rural locality is situated 3 km from Kursk Vostochny Airport, 122 km from Belgorod International Airport and 199 km from Voronezh Peter the Great Airport.

References

Notes

Sources

Rural localities in Kursky District, Kursk Oblast